Repasi is a Hungarian surname. Notable people with the surname include:

 László Répási (born 1966), Hungarian footballer
 René Repasi (born 1979), German politician of Hungarian descent

See also
 Repaš

Surnames of Hungarian origin